Renato Bartolomei was born in Australia of Italian descent.
Starting his acting career in Australia, he is now a prominent actor in New Zealand, who had a prominent role as Craig Valentine in Shortland Street.

He starred in the TV2 series The Cult, as Michael Lewis.

Filmography

Film
 I'm Not Harry Jenson (2009) as Colby

Television
 Blue Heelers (1994–1995) as Detective Scarlatti
 Xena: Warrior Princess (2000–2001) as Beowulf
 Mercy Peak (2001–2002) as Kieran Masfield
 Shortland Street (2004–2008) as Craig Valentine
 Legend of the Seeker  (2008–2009) as Demmin Nass
 The Cult (2009), as Michael Lewis
 Intrepid Journeys (Travel series) (2011), as himself

Awards

References

External links

New Zealand male film actors
New Zealand male television actors
New Zealand male soap opera actors
1963 births
Living people
20th-century New Zealand male actors
21st-century New Zealand male actors